Savannah State University (Savannah State or SSU) is a public historically black university in Savannah, Georgia. It is the oldest historically black public university in the state. The university is a member-school of the Thurgood Marshall College Fund.

Savannah State operates four colleges (College of Business Administration, College of Liberal Arts and Social Sciences, College of Sciences and Technology and the Savannah State University College of Education). In addition to four distinct academic colleges, the university also offers Office of Graduate Studies and Sponsored Research (OGSSR).  It also participates in research centers and programs at the Center for Teaching, Learning and Academic Support; Savannah Entrepreneurial Center; the Midtown Project; the Georgia Institute of Technology Regional Engineering Program (GTREP); and "A Collaboration to Integrate Research and Education in Marine and Environmental Science and Biotechnology" with the Skidaway Institute of Oceanography, part of the University of Georgia.

History

Establishment
Savannah State University was founded as a result of the Second Morrill Land Grant Act of August 30, 1890.  The act mandated that southern and border states develop land grant colleges for black students, as their systems were segregated. On November 26, 1890, the Georgia General Assembly passed legislation creating the Georgia State Industrial College for Colored Youth.

A preliminary session of the school was held in the Baxter Street School Building in Athens, where Richard R. Wright Sr. was principal. The college operated in Athens for several months in 1891 before moving to its permanent location in Savannah on October 7, 1891, with Wright as the first president. The school had five faculty members.  Its eight students were all graduates of Edmund Asa Ware High School, the first public high school for blacks in Augusta.

Early years
The college awarded its first baccalaureate degree in 1898. In 1921 the first female students were admitted as residents on the campus.  In 1928 the college became a full four-year degree-granting institution and ended the high school and normal school programs.  Normal schools had been created in the 19th century in many state systems in the United States, after the German model, to educate teachers for elementary school students.  With the expansion of towns across the US, and continuing issues in trying to educate four million freedmen and their descendants, there was an urgent need to establish many new schools and to quickly train teachers in the North and the South.  States used normal schools for training teachers for primary school grades and sometimes secondary school as well. Normal schools or colleges tended to have two or three-year programs.  Gradually the normal schools were converted to full colleges with four-year curricula, or were left behind.

In 1932 the college became a full member institution of the University System of Georgia and its name was changed to Georgia State College. The college served as Georgia's land-grant institution for African-American students until 1947.  The designation was then transferred to Fort Valley State College. In January 1950, the college changed its name to Savannah State College.

Modern history
With the growth in its graduate and research programs, in 1996 the Board of Regents of the University System of Georgia elevated Savannah State College to the status of state university and the name was changed to Savannah State University.

In 2008, a proposal was made to merge Savannah State University with Armstrong Atlantic State University, but it did not pass.

Savannah State University is the first institution in the state of Georgia to offer the homeland security degree program.  It was the second institution in the University System of Georgia to offer wireless Internet connectivity to students throughout the campus.

Academics
Savannah State offers undergraduate and graduate degrees through the following colleges:

College of Business Administration
College of Sciences and Technology
College of Liberal Arts and Social Sciences
College of Education

Students may choose from 23 accredited undergraduate baccalaureate and 5 graduate master's degree programs offered through the university's colleges.  The university has developed new partnerships that expand the range of programs and resources for students.  Taking advantage of its location on the coast, the university's Marine Biology Department operates two research vessels: the R/V Sea Otter (a  twin diesel vessel owned by NOAA) and the R/V Tiger (a  outboard work boat).  In the fall of 2007 Savannah State teamed with the U.S. Army Corps of Engineers to offer a new course in environmental regulations, so students can deepen understanding of policy and implementation issues.  The program also helps them learn about specific environmental topics.

Savannah State established an honors program for qualified high-achieving and ambitious undergraduate students.

Accreditation
Accredited by the Commission on Colleges of the Southern Association of Colleges and Schools, Savannah State University also has achieved fully accredited programs in specialized areas of science and engineering: 
 Civil engineering technology (Technology Accreditation Commission of the Accreditation Board for Engineering and Technology)
 Electronics engineering technology (Technology Accreditation Commission of the Accreditation Board for Engineering and Technology and National Association of Radio and Telecommunications Engineers, Inc. (NARTE))
 Mechanical engineering technology (Technology Accreditation Commission of the Accreditation Board for Engineering and Technology)
Additionally, the Chemistry department is American Chemical Society (ACS) certified.

The bachelor and masters programs in Social Work are accredited by the (Council on Social Work Education), and the masters in Public Administration by the National Association of Schools of Public Affairs and Administration.

The College of Business Administration is accredited by the Association to Advance Collegiate Schools of Business (AACSB) International, and the Mass Communications Department is accredited by the Accrediting Council on Education in Journalism and Mass Communications (ACEJMC).

Administration

Academic oversight
Oversight is provided by the University System of Georgia, the organizational body that sets goals and dictates general policy to all public educational institutions in the state.

Funding 
Savannah State is a public institution, receiving funds from the State of Georgia, tuition, fees, research grants, private scholarship funds (including the Thurgood Marshall Scholarship Fund and the Tom Joyner Foundation), and alumni contributions. The University System of Georgia is governed by the Georgia Board of Regents and dispenses public funds (allocated by the state's legislature) to Savannah State, excluding lottery-funded HOPE Scholarships. The university's endowment was $2,433,508. As of FY05, the university's budget was $42,155,964. In FY06, the university received $7,725,311 in research, instruction, and public service contracts and grants.

Campus

The campus is accessible from Interstate 95 and Interstate 16. Spanish moss drapes the dense live oak trees, while palm trees, magnolias, and a wide variety of azaleas, camellias, and other native plants are scattered throughout the  marsh-side campus.

Early years
Several of the campus' older buildings were originally constructed by students and faculty members, and display architectural styles from the past century.

Historic facilities
The Georgia Historical Commission and the Georgia Department of Natural Resources have recognized both the Savannah State campus and Hill Hall as a part of the Georgia Historical Marker Program.

Hill Hall

Walter Bernard Hill Hall, built between 1900 and 1901 by students studying manual arts and blacksmithing, was added to the National Register of Historic Places in 1981. The facility had a variety of uses, including a bookstore, student center, male dormitory, and library. Needing too much renovation for continued use, the building was closed in 1996. The university and community created the Hill Hall Restoration Project to raise money for the project.  After restoration, the building was reopened in 2008. It houses the university's Enrollment Management Center, a presidential suite, administrative offices, a lecture hall, a banquet room, and a small museum.

Athletic facilities

Tiger Arena is the 6,000-seat multi-purpose arena which serves as the home for the university's basketball team and athletic department offices. Ted A. Wright Football Stadium is the home of the university's football team and has an Olympic outdoor track. The 7,500-seat multi-purpose stadium opened in 1967.  The track was constructed in 1995.

Recent additions 
On October 15, 2007, Savannah State broke ground on a new academic building which was dedicated on May 1, 2009. It includes 10 classrooms, three lecture rooms, three computer labs, and applied research and observation labs. The building also houses the Africana studies exhibit, the Dean of Humanities and faculty offices, Public Administration/Urban Studies, and the Social Work and Social and Behavioral Sciences departments.

Student life
The student body consists of approximately 3,800 graduate and undergraduate students, and 385 full-time instructional faculty.

The university offers organized and informal co-curricular activities, including 75 student organizations, leadership workshops, 15 intramural activities, student publications and student internships.

Wesleyan Gospel Choir 
The SSU Wesleyan Gospel Choir was established in 1971.
In 2004 the choir completed and released a live album,  entitled RLW: "Revelation, Love, & Worship".
Members of the Wesleyan Gospel Choir participated in the NBCAHF Inaugural Gospel Explosion competition in 2006 and the International Gospel Retreat, which aired on The Word Network. In 2007 the choir performed at the Dr. Bobby Jones International Gospel Music Industry Retreat, which was also broadcast on The Word Network.  The choir performed with Ann Nesby during the 13th annual Savannah Black Heritage Festival.

Powerhouse Of The South

The university band, nicknamed the "Powerhouse of the South", performs during Savannah State football games. They were featured performers in the Honda Battle of the Bands in 2004, 2005, & 2023.

National fraternities and sororities
All nine of the National Pan-Hellenic Council organizations currently have chapters at Savannah State University.  These organizations are:

Other national fraternities and sororities with registered chapters currently on campus include:

At one time Alpha Phi Omega service fraternity had a registered chapter at Savannah State.

Student media

The Tiger's Roar
The Tiger's Roar is the official student-produced newspaper of Savannah State University and provides both a print and online version.

WHCJ radio station

SSU operates WHCJ (FM) radio, which broadcasts 24 hours a day from the campus, covers all of Chatham County, and can also be heard in Effingham, Bryan, Beaufort, and Liberty counties.

Established in 1975 and known as "the Voice of Savannah State University", WHCJ's current play formats include gospel, jazz, reggae, blues and salsa music, as well as talk shows, commentaries, and cultural enrichment programming.

Athletics 

The Savannah State Tigers represent the university in college intercollegate athletics and are administered by the Savannah State University Athletic Department. The department dedicates about $2 million per year for its sports teams and facilities.

Savannah State University holds membership in the National Collegiate Athletic Association (NCAA) Division II as a member of the Southern Intercollegiate Athletic Conference (SIAC) and participates in the following sports: football, baseball, basketball (men and women), cross-country (men and women), tennis (men and women), track and field (men and women), volleyball (women only), golf (men), and softball (women). In April 2017 Savannah State University President Cheryl Dozier announced the school intends to reclassify all athletic programs to Division II The move back to Division II is expected to occur for the 2019-20 academic year. The Georgia school would end its membership in the Mid-Eastern Athletic Conference, which it joined in 2010

The school gained notoriety when they finished the 2004–2005 men's basketball season a winless 0–28, the first Division I team to do so since Prairie View A&M University in 1991–1992. The team's final game (a 49–44 loss to Florida A&M) was covered by several national sports organizations including ESPN.

SSU Cheer
Savannah State University's competitive cheerleading team became the first team from a HBCU to win a national cheerleading title in February 2017.  The 13-member team won a CheerSport National title for their top score routine.

See also

 List of Savannah State University alumni
 List of Savannah State University faculty
 President of Savannah State University

Notes
A.On April 19, 2011 the Georgia Board of Regents for the University System of Georgia voted not to renew Dr. Earl Yarbrough's annual contract as president of the university. Cheryl Davenport Dozier was named as acting president of the university on April 21, 2011 and the Georgia Board of Regents plans to conduct a national search for Yarbrough's replacement. Dr. Dozier became the permanent president on May 9, 2012.

References

Further reading

External links
 Official website
 Official athletics website

 
Historically black schools
African-American history in Savannah, Georgia
Historically black universities and colleges in the United States
Public universities and colleges in Georgia (U.S. state)
Educational institutions established in 1890
Universities and colleges accredited by the Southern Association of Colleges and Schools
University and college buildings on the National Register of Historic Places in Georgia (U.S. state)
Universities and colleges in Savannah, Georgia
National Register of Historic Places in Savannah, Georgia
1890 establishments in Georgia (U.S. state)